Emmanuel Jacquin de Margerie (December 25, 1924 - December 2, 1991) was an Ambassador of France, author and promoter of the Arts.

Career
The son of Roland de Margerie, French Ambassador to Spain, the Holy See and Germany, grandson of Pierre de Margerie, ambassador to Belgium and Germany and cousin of the geologist, Emmanuel de Margerie, he studied at the universities of Aurore in Shangaï and the Sorbonne, graduating with degrees from Sciences Po and ENA.

De Margerie joined the Quai d'Orsay, serving as Head of European Affairs, before postings as:
Ambassador to Spain, from 1977 to 1981;
Ambassador to the United Kingdom, from 1981 to 1984;
Ambassador to the United States, from 1984 to 1989.

As founding director of Musées de France, he helped in the creation of the Musée d'Orsay. He also served as chairman of Christie's in Europe and president of World Monuments Fund (France) until his death in 1991.

Honours
  Officer, Légion d'honneur
  Commander, Ordre national du Mérite
  Gran Cruz, Order of Isabella the Catholic
  Knight, Sovereign Military Order of Malta
  Cross, pro Merito Melitensi.

See also
 Jacquin de Margerie family

References

External links
 www.lexpress.fr
 www.christies.com
 www.louvre.fr

1924 births
1991 deaths
Diplomats from Paris
University of Paris alumni
Sciences Po alumni
École nationale d'administration alumni
20th-century French diplomats
Ambassadors of France to the United States
Ambassadors of France to the United Kingdom
Ambassadors of France to Spain
Knights of Malta
Officiers of the Légion d'honneur
Commanders of the Ordre national du Mérite
Recipients of the Order pro Merito Melitensi
French expatriates in China